Julio Francis Ribeiro (born 5 May 1929, in Bombay) is a retired Indian police officer and civil servant.
He held increasingly responsible positions during his career, and led the Punjab Police during part of the Punjab insurgency periods.
In 1987, he was awarded the Padma Bhushan, India's third highest civilian award for his services.

Career
Ribeiro joined the Indian Police Service in 1953 and rose to be the Commissioner of Mumbai Police from 1982 to 1986.
He was promoted to Director General of Central Reserve Police Force, then to Director General Police of Gujarat.

Ribeiro served as Director General of Punjab Police during its worst years of terrorism in Punjab.
The New York Times reported that in the 1980s, Ribeiro led the Punjab police in a "ferocious crackdown" on Sikh militants, in a policy christened "bullet for bullet" by Arun Nehru.

He held positions such as Special Secretary to the Government of India in the Ministry of Home Affairs and Adviser to the Governor of Punjab.

Ribeiro also served as Indian Ambassador to Romania from 1989 until 1993.
In August 1991, Ribeiro was attacked and wounded in a Bucharest assassination attempt by gunmen identified as Punjabi Sikhs.

In an April 2006 interview with The Tribune, Julio Ribeiro explained that "It has been a role reversal for me... from fighting militants to fighting the corrupt administration."
He went on to explain that while he had been offered positions in government, "Fighting with guns was no longer my cup of tea; and I wanted to work for the people of my city, Mumbai. I wanted to be useful to lower socio-economic classes, and thus decided to work at the grass roots level."

He also serves as non-executive Director to Glenmark Pharmaceuticals and as a Director of IIT Corporate Services Ltd. He is usually interviewed for his views on communal harmony.

1986 assassination attempt
In the early morning of 3 October 1986, 6 men in police disguise, identified in the press as Sikh militants attacked Ribeiro inside the headquarters of Punjab Police in the city of Jalandhar, Punjab, India. One guard was killed. Ribeiro, his wife, and four other police and paramilitary officers were injured. Ribeiro's wound was minor, but his wife was hospitalized. All six attackers escaped in a waiting truck. The Khalistan Commando Force (KCF) later claimed responsibility of this attack. KCF leader Labh Singh allegedly led the assassination attempt.

1991 assassination attempt
In August 1991, Ribeiro, then Indian Ambassador to Romania
was attacked and wounded in a Bucharest assassination attempt by gunmen identified as Punjabi Sikhs.

Personal life
Julio Ribeiro is married to Melba Ribeiro, has two daughters Nina and Anna, and lives in Mumbai, India.

Ribeiro titled his autobiography Bullet for Bullet: My Life as a Police Officer.

References

External links
 Profile of Julio Ribeiro
 
 Karna Scholarship Trustees page accessed 21 April 2008 

Living people
Insurgency in Punjab
1929 births
Police Commissioners of Mumbai
Recipients of the Padma Bhushan in civil service
Victims of Sikh terrorism
Ambassadors of India to Romania